Zawiaty  (German Saviat, 1938-1945 Seeblick) is a village in the administrative district of Gmina Czarna Dąbrówka, within Bytów County, Pomeranian Voivodeship, in northern Poland.

References

Zawiaty